This is a list of dystopian films. Dystopian societies appear in many speculative fiction works and are often found within the science fiction and fantasy genres. Dystopias are often characterized by dehumanization, totalitarian governments, ruthless megacorporations, environmental disasters, or other characteristics associated with a dramatic decline in society.

List

See also
 List of dystopian literature
 List of dystopian comics
 List of biopunk and cyberpunk works
 Apocalyptic and post-apocalyptic fiction

References

 
Dystopian films
Dystopian films
1920s in film
1930s in film
1950s in film
1960s in film
1970s in film
1980s in film
1990s in film
2000s in film
2010s in film
2020s in film